Kate Baer is an American writer who currently lives in Hummelstown, Pennsylvania. Her writing describes a range of topics, including motherhood, love, and loss.

Early life and education 
Baer grew up outside of Philadelphia, the daughter of an elementary school teacher and a meatpacking plant worker-turned-Christian radio host. She learned about poetry as she majored in English at Eastern Mennonite University. Her favorite writer is Margaret Atwood.

Publications 
Her first piece of paid writing was a book of poetry entitled What Kind of Woman. The book was published in 2020, and topped the New York Times Best Seller list. 

In 2020 she started to write poetry for her second book. Leveraging the style of erasure poetry, Baer turned messages and hate mail she received via social media into poems. The poems that resulted were published as a second collection titled I Hope This Finds You Well in 2021.

Baer's third poetry collection, And Yet: Poems, was published on 8 November 2022. Like the previous collections, And Yet: Poems, was a New York Times Best Seller.

References

External links
 

Living people
Poets from Pennsylvania
21st-century American poets
21st-century American women writers
American women poets
Year of birth missing (living people)
American Mennonites
Mennonite writers
Mennonite poets